Turris elsmerensis is an extinct species of sea snail, a marine gastropod mollusk in the family Turridae, the turrids.

Description
Average measurements of the shell: 29.0 x 11.0 mm.

Distribution
Fossils of this marine species were found in Pliocene strata in California, USA (age range: 5.332 to 3.6 Ma)

References

  W. A. English. 1914. The Fernando Group near Newhall, California. University of California Publications Bulletin of the Department of Geology 8(8):203-218

elsmerensis
Gastropods described in 1914